Bleakley is a surname. Notable people with the surname include:

 Christine Lampard, née Bleakley (born 1979), Northern Irish television presenter
 David Bleakley (19252017), Northern Irish politician
 Hoyt Bleakley, American economist
 Josiah Bleakley (c. 17541822), Canadian fur trader
 Orrin Dubbs Bleakley (18541927), American politician
 William F. Bleakley (18831969), American attorney, New York Supreme Court justice and politician
 William Ward Bleakley (19832009), American victim of boat capsizing